The Alwatan and Asnan International is a men's squash tournament held in South Surra, Kuwait.

The event is part of the PSA World Tour. It was established in 2013.

Past Results

References

External links
- PSA Alwatan and Asnan International 2013

Squash tournaments in Kuwait